"American Bad Ass" is a song by the American musician Kid Rock, released from his 2000 album The History of Rock. "American Bad Ass" samples Metallica's "Sad but True."

Music video
The music video for the single aired on MTV2 upon release, and reached #1 on Canada's MuchMusic Countdown. The song was performed on Saturday Night Live.

At the beginning, Kid Rock watches TV and then after going to a rapping party, he goes to a concert on a cabriolet, surrounded by bikers. At the middle of the song, Kid Rock's car explodes and the thrash metal party starts to play. At the end of the video, Kid Rock with his band plays at a concert on the stage.

The video features a cameo appearance by Ron Jeremy.

This is the last music video to feature Joe C. before his death.

In popular culture

After the USS Cole bombing in October 2000, the song was played on the ship's PA system upon leaving the port of Yemen after the national anthem and other patriotic songs were played.
A version of the song was used as the entrance theme for WWF (now WWE) wrestler The Undertaker in 2000 for his "American Badass" persona. It was replaced by Limp Bizkit's "Rollin" in the same year. The Undertaker used the song as his entrance theme 23 years later for his appearance at Raw is XXX in January 2023.

Track listing
"American Bad Ass" (clean album version)
"3 Sheets to the Wind" (Live)
"Cowboy" (Live)

Charts

References

Kid Rock songs
2000 singles
Songs written by Kid Rock
Songs written by James Hetfield
Songs written by Lars Ulrich
2000 songs
Atlantic Records singles
Nu metal songs
Rap metal songs